The Rupsa River is a river in southwestern Bangladesh and a distributary of the Ganges. Rupsha is one of the most famous rivers of Bangladesh.

Description
It forms from the confluence of the Bhairab and Madhumati rivers, and flows into the Pasur River. Its entire length is affected by tides.

It flows by the side of Khulna, and connects to the Bay of Bengal through Poshur river at Mongla channel. Near Chalna, it changes its name to Pasur River and flows into the Bay of Bengal.

A significant number of fisheries, dockyards, shipyards and factories are situated on the bank of this river.  A significant number of families depend on catching fish in the river.  There is a bridge over the river named Khan Jahan Ali Bridge. This bridge connects Khulna and Bagerhat Districts.

References

External links

Rivers of Bangladesh
Khulna
Rivers of Khulna Division